Reşit Altan Erkekli (born 18 January 1955) is a Turkish theatre, film and television actor.

Filmography

Films:

 1982 Dolap Beyiri
 1989 Can Şenliği
 1991 Deniz Gurbetçileri
 1993 Mavi Sürgün
 1996 80. Adım
 2000 Merdiven
 2001 Vizontele - (as Nazmi Doğan)
 2004 Hızlı Adımlar - Lütfü
 2004 Vizontele Tuuba - (as Nazmi Doğan)
 2005 Istanbul Tales (Anlat İstanbul) - Hilmi
 2005 Organize İşler - (as Yusuf Ziya Ocak)
 2006 The Exam - (as Almancı Sedat)
 2006 Eve Dönüş - (as Hoca)
 2006 Unutulmayanlar - (as Aziz)
 2006 Cenneti Beklerken - (as Çoban)
 2008 O... Çocuklari
 2009 I Saw the Sun
 2011 Love Likes Coincidences
 2012 Uzun Hikâye
 2013 Umut Üzümleri
 2014 Yağmur: Kıyamet Çiçeği
 2017 Ayla: The Daughter of War
 2018 Bizi Hatırla
 2019 Çiçero
 2019 Hababam Sınıfı Yeniden
 2019 Enes Batur Gerçek Kahraman
 2019 Görülmüştür
 2020 Ağır Romantik
 2020 Hababam Sınıfı Yaz Oyunları
 2022 Bandırma Füze Kulübü

TV series:

 1994 Kurtuluş (as Yakup Kadri Bey)
 2001–2007 Bir Demet Tiyatro
 2003 Havada Bulut
 2003 Bir İstanbul Masalı (as Cemal Kozan)
 2005–2007 Beyaz Gelincik (as Halil Aslanbaş)
 2014 Sen Olsan Ne Yapardın
 2015 Kara Ekmek
 2016 Hangimiz Sevmedik
 2017 Nerdesin Birader
 2019 Vurgun
 2019 Dengi Dengine
 2019–2020 Afili Aşk
 2020 Ya İstiklal Ya Ölüm
 2021 Payitaht Abdülhamid
 2021 Yeşilçam
 2021 Baht Oyunu

References

External links
 
 Sinematurk 2.0 - Altan Erkekli

Living people
1955 births
Male actors from Istanbul
Turkish male film actors
Turkish male stage actors
Best Actor Golden Orange Award winners
Kadıköy Anadolu Lisesi alumni
Turkish male television actors